Nuclear receptor-binding protein is a protein that in humans is encoded by the NRBP1 gene.

References

Further reading